8 Diagrams is the fifth studio album by American hip hop group Wu-Tang Clan, released December 11, 2007, on SRC/Universal Motown Records. The album was released three years after the death of Ol' Dirty Bastard, and six years after the group's previous LP Iron Flag.

Upon its release, 8 Diagrams debuted at number 25 on the Billboard 200, and number 9 on the Top R&B/Hip-Hop Albums chart with 68,000 copies sold in the first week. It has sold 202,000 copies in the United States as of April 2014. The album received generally favorable reviews from most music critics, and earned greater praise than the group's previous album Iron Flag, based on an aggregate score of 73/100 from Metacritic.

Background 
8 Diagrams marked the group's first full collaboration since the death of original member Ol' Dirty Bastard, who had died in 2004. The album's title is derived from the martial arts film The Eight Diagram Pole Fighter. The group, which had not released an album since 2001's Iron Flag, signed a one-album deal with Steve Rifkind's SRC Records in December 2006. Wu-Tang's four previous albums were all released on Rifkind's now-defunct Loud Records.

On Sunday, August 5, 2007, at the Virgin Festival in Baltimore, RZA announced that the release date for the album would be November 13, 2007, noting that this is the third anniversary of the death of Ol' Dirty Bastard.  However, the date was delayed to December 11, 2007.

In a released statement, group leader RZA commented on the need for the group's return, stating "This is the perfect time for us to come back; the stars are aligned. It's like when we first started with Steve. We put out real hip-hop at a time when it was turning into pop or R&B. We brought the focus back to the music in its rawest form, without studio polish or radio hooks.... People want something that gives them an adrenaline rush. We're here to supply that fix. How could hip-hop be dead if Wu-Tang is forever? We're here to revive the spirit and the economics and bring in a wave of energy that has lately dissipated".

At the public premiere of Wu: The Story of the Wu-Tang in New York City, Cappadonna revealed that Wu-Tang had recorded between 40 and 50 songs for the record, of which around fourteen would make up 8 Diagrams. Prior to the album's release, Loud.com issued a free 8 Diagrams mixtape containing exclusive and unreleased tracks, including "Thug World", "Life Changes", "Stick Me for My Riches", and "Weak Spot".

In 2019, RZA revealed that 8 Diagrams was originally going to be the group's final album.

Music

Collaborations 
8 Diagrams featured the eight living original Wu-Tang Clan members, with previously recorded material from Ol' Dirty Bastard, as well as a tribute track titled "Life Changes." The album marked the official inclusion of long time Wu-Tang Clan affiliate Cappadonna as an official member. Auxiliary member Streetlife also appears on the album.

In an article from NME, it was stated that the album would feature production from  Easy Mo Bee, Marley Marl, Q-Tip, DJ Scratch and Nile Rodgers, though Easy Mo Bee would end up being the only producer on the list to make it on the album. George Clinton of P-Funk, Dhani Harrison, John Frusciante of the Red Hot Chili Peppers, and Shavo Odadjian, bassist of System of a Down also make appearances on 8 Diagrams.

Artistic disagreements 
Unlike Wu-Tang's previous albums, which used the "darker, sinister, and street-oriented, signature Wu sound", RZA utilized a more experimental, orchestral, and more universal choice of music production for the album.

Ghostface Killah and Raekwon stated in interviews that they were not comfortable with the album's release as it did not contain the signature "Wu-Tang sound". Raekwon planned 
a follow-up group album entitled "Shaolin Vs. Wu-Tang" without input from RZA. It was later announced in Vibe magazine, however, that Shaolin Vs. Wu-Tang would be Raekwon's fifth solo album, and that it would feature guest appearances from several other group members, with no contributions from RZA. In regards to the album's direction, Raekwon stated "RZA doesn't have to be on every album. I wanted to give some other producers a chance. It's not about beef. We can stand on our own."

Singles 
In a BBC Radio 1Xtra interview, Method Man stated that "Watch Your Mouth" would be the album's first single. However, it was rumored that the song's producer DJ Scratch was unable to get a sample clearance, which resulted in its omission on the final release of the album.

Instead, the first official single was "The Heart Gently Weeps", an adaptation of the Beatles song "While My Guitar Gently Weeps". George Harrison's son Dhani Harrison and John Frusciante of Red Hot Chili Peppers performed acoustic and lead and guitars respectively. Originally thought to be a sampled track, it was later revealed as an interpolated version, sampling Jimmy Ponder's cover of the song. The song features Raekwon, Ghostface, and Method Man rapping and guest singing provided by Erykah Badu. RZA also confirmed that Stone Mecca, one of the newer Wu-Tang-affiliated groups, contributed backing music to the track.

Critical reception 

Upon its release, 8 Diagrams received generally positive reviews from most music critics. At Metacritic, which assigns a normalized rating out of 100 to reviews from mainstream critics, the album received an average score of 73, based on 33 reviews, which indicates "generally favorable reviews". USA Todays Steve Jones commended the group members' performances despite the absence of Ol’ Dirty Bastard, stating "the lyrical swords wielded by the nine surviving members are as razor-sharp as ever". Rolling Stone writer Christian Hoard called it "a terrific mix of classic Clan grime and enough new tricks to justify Inspectah Deck's claim that 'Wu-Tang keep it fresh like Tupperware.'". Marisa Brown of Allmusic praised RZA's production, writing that "It's beautifully, impeccably produced, from the soundtrack strings and horns, to the philosophical samples and guitars that are interspersed throughout ... it deepens and grows with every listen." Brown wrote that the album "does focus on melody and guitars and strings, but it is also lush and well-crafted and smart and addictive. Part of what's made RZA and the rest of the Clan thrive is their unpredictability and inventiveness, and so to create something expected would be counterintuitive to the group's ethos, and to what's made them so revered and respected across nations and genres and generations."

However, Entertainment Weeklys Neil Drumming commented that the album is "... a drab dilution of the Wu's signature sample-heavy, raucous sound." Thomas Golianopolous of Spin viewed that "The beats are mostly to blame [...] skeletal, low-key tracks that rarely match the rappers' palpable energy". Giving the album 2 out of 4 stars, Los Angeles Times called its arrangements "largely tepid" and wrote that several songs lack the rappers' "distinctive personalities". Slant Magazine's Dave Hughes wrote that the album "fails to cohere into anything greater than the sum of its parts" and expressed a mixed response towards RZA's production, stating "when RZA isn't attempting to tone-deafly integrate other people's old sounds into his old sounds, he just sticks with his old sounds". Kelefa Sanneh of The New York Times criticized the album's production as well, but complimented the performances of Ghostface Killah and Raekwon, stating that they "provide many of the album’s highlights."

Dave Heaton of PopMatters wrote "Critics often use the word 'cinematic' to describe the Wu-Tang sound. That word has never been more appropriate than with 8 Diagrams. RZA taps into his Ghost Dog and Kill Bill experiences to create imaginary film music, moody would-be scores to Westerns, martial arts, sci-fi and gangster films." Blenders Jonah Weiner commended RZA's production as well, stating "RZA has always been hip-hop’s reigning minimalist, but his work scoring Kill Bill, most recently, seems to have strengthened his ear for ambiance and texture." Weiner also complimented Method Man's delivery and rhymes on the album, stating that he sounds "rejuvenated." Pitchfork Media's Nate Patrin complimented the group members' lyricism. Sam Richards of Uncut gave 8 Diagrams 4 out of 5 stars, and stated "RZA’s lurching beats and raw, spectral productions, peppered with kung-fu film samples, are back to their thrillingly weird best. RZA’s dictatorial rule has ostracised Ghost and Raekwon, but you can’t argue with the results. On record at least, Wu-Tang have made the comeback of the decade."

Track listing 

Notes
  signifies a co-producer.
 "Unpredictable" contains additional vocals by Dexter Wiggle and bass guitars by Shavo Odadjian.
 "The Heart Gently Weeps" contains lead guitars by John Frusciante and rhythm guitar and percussion by Dhani Harrison.
 "Gun Will Go" contains additional vocals by Sunny Valentine.
 "Stick Me for My Riches" contains additional vocals by Gerald Alston.
 "Starter" contains additional vocals by Sunny Valentine and Tash Mahogany.
 "Windmill" contains guitars by John Frusciante.

Sample credits
 "Campfire" contains a sample from "Gypsy Woman" as performed by The Persuasions, and dialogue from Shaolin & Wu-Tang and Writing Kung Fu.
 "Take it Back" contains a sample from "Nautilus" as performed by Bob James.
 "Rushing Elephants" contains a sample from "Marcia in LA (Alzati spia)" as performed by Ennio Morricone.
 "Unpredictable" contains a sample from "Wailing Wail" as performed by Nicolas Flagello.
 "The Heart Gently Weeps" contains an interpolation of "While My Guitar Gently Weeps" as performed by The Beatles.
 "Stick Me for My Riches" contains a sample from "Hang on Sloopy" as performed by David Porter. 
 "Windmill" contains samples from "Bang Bang (My Baby Shot Me Down)" as performed by Nancy Sinatra, "Ain't No Sunshine" as performed by Lyn Collins and "Brave and Strong" as performed by Sly and the Family Stone.
 "Weak Spot" contains a sample from "Sneakin' in the Back" as performed by Tom Scott.
 "Life Changes" contains samples from "The Road We Didn't Take" as performed by Freda Payne, and "Easiest Way to Fall" as performed by Freda Payne.

Personnel 

 RZA – performer, strings, arranger, programming, producer, engineer, mixing
 GZA – performer
 Method Man – performer
 Raekwon – performer
 Ghostface Killah – performer
 Inspectah Deck – performer
 U-God – performer
 Masta Killa – performer
 Cappadonna – performer
 Erykah Badu – vocals
 George Clinton – vocals
 Dexter Wiggle – vocals
 Sunny Valentine – vocals
 Gerald Alston – vocals
 Tash Mahogany – vocals
 John Frusciante – guitar
 Dhani Harrison – guitar
 Shavo Odadjian – bass
 Gary Foote – bass

 Trevor James – bass
 Marco Vitali – strings
 Lamont Dozier – composer
 George Drakoulias – producer, engineer
 Mathematics – producer
 Easy Mo Bee – producer, programing
 Mitchell Diggs – executive producer
 Oliver Grant – executive producer
 Jose Reynoso -	engineer, mixing
 Bob Lanzner – mastering
 Steve Chahley – mixing, assistant
 Sandy Brummels – creative director
 Alexx Henry – photography
 Jason Kpana – A&R
 Tamika Layton – A&R
 Jamaal Meeks -	A&R
 Vickie Charles – publicity
 Daniel Pappas – marketing
 Tatia Fox – marketing
 Eva Ries – marketing

Charts

Weekly charts

Year-end charts

References

External links 
 8 Diagrams at Discogs

Wu-Tang Clan albums
2007 albums
Albums produced by RZA
Albums produced by Easy Mo Bee
Albums produced by George Drakoulias
Universal Records albums